The Zuñi Mountains (Navajo:Naasht'ézhí Dził or Ńdíshchííʼ Ląʼí) are a mountain range located mainly in Cibola County of northwestern New Mexico, United States, with a small portion extending into McKinley County. The range is located largely in the Cibola National Forest, lying south of Interstate 40 from southeast of Gallup to southwest of Grants. The highest point is Mount Sedgwick, 9,256 feet (2,821 m); elevations in the range go down to 6,400 feet (1,950 m).

Location 
The towns of Grants, Gallup, and Ramah are located northeast, northwest, and southwest of the range, respectively. The Zuñi Mountains sit on the Continental Divide and form part of the southeastern edge of the Colorado Plateau.

History 
The history of the range includes ancient and continuing use of the mountains by local native peoples, including the Zuni, Acoma, and Navajo; extensive logging in the early half of the 20th century; and agriculture and mining (including copper and fluorspar) in the mid-20th century.

Geology 
The Zuñi Mountains form a northwest–southeast trending uplift with a core of Precambrian granite and metamorphic rocks, surrounded by Late Permian and Triassic to Jurassic strata. Precambrian rocks in the range were uplifted during the Ancestral Rocky Mountains orogeny as part of the Zuni-Defiance Uplift in the Pennsylvanian Period. The current physiographic expression of the range is the result of uplift during the Cretaceous–Paleogene Laramide Orogeny approximately 80 to 40 million years ago.

See also

 List of mountain ranges of New Mexico

References

External links

 Zuni Mountains at the New Mexico Tourism Department

Mountain ranges of New Mexico
Cibola National Forest
Great Divide of North America
Landforms of Cibola County, New Mexico